Territorial Assembly elections were held in Wallis and Futuna on 25 March 2012. Thirty party lists contested to fill the twenty seats. The major election issues were the cost of living, economic development, and wallis and Futuna's relationship with France. Turnout was 85.95%.

Only nine incumbents were re-elected. Among those to be defeated was Victor Brial, a former member of the French National Assembly, and Assembly President Siliako Lauhea.

Following the election the Territorial Assembly for the first time elected a Socialist, Vetelino Nau, as President of the assembly by 11 votes to 9. Mikaele Kulimoetoke was elected as vice-president, and Petelo Hanisi as president of the standing committee.

Elected members

References

Elections in Wallis and Futuna
2012 elections in Oceania
Territorial elections
March 2012 events in Oceania